SM UC-30 was a German Type UC II minelaying submarine or U-boat in the German Imperial Navy during World War I. The U-boat was ordered on 29 August 1915 and was launched on 27 July 1916. She was commissioned into the German Imperial Navy on 22 August 1916 as SM UC-30. In four patrols UC-30 was credited with sinking five ships, either by torpedo or by mines laid. UC-30 was mined and sunk off Horns Reef on 21 April 1917. The wreck was discovered in 2016.

Design
A German Type UC II submarine, UC-30 had a displacement of  when at the surface and  while submerged. The submarine was powered by two six-cylinder four-stroke diesel engines each producing  (a total of ), two electric motors producing , and two propeller shafts.

UC-30 was fitted with six  mine tubes, eighteen UC 200 mines, three  torpedo tubes (one on the stern and two on the bow), seven torpedoes, and one  Uk L/30 deck gun. Her complement was twenty-six crew members.

Captain 
On 20 June 1917 the remains of a human whose mostly decomposed remains were kept together by a German uniform was found washed ashore in Bjergehuse in Sønder Nissum parish, Denmark. The parish priest described the remains as those of a ca. 30-year-old, handsomely and strongly built man and assumed him to be a downed and drowned airman. The remains were buried in the parish on 23 June 1917. On 17 October 1917 the German legation in Copenhagen informed the ministry for Ecclesiastical Affairs that the remains had been identified as those of the captain of submarine 30, Kapitänleutnant Johann Heinrich Wilhelm Maximilian Stenzler and requested on behalf of his family that his remains be exhumed and transferred to Germany for burial there. On 15 November 1917 the grave was thus opened, the remains transferred to a zinc lined coffin and repatriated. On 28 November 1917 Stenzler was buried in the family grave in Stralsund. The Sønder Nissum parish priest received a letter from Stenzler's mother, a widow in Stralsund. According to this letter, Stenzler was born 1 July 1886 in Cassel, to Max Israël formerly mayor of Stralsund and Maria née Wellsmann and later took the name Stenzler.

Wreck 
The wreck was located by JD-Contractor A/S in 2016 outside Esbjerg, still carrying 18 mines and 6 torpedoes. The submerged wreck was identified in part using multibeam sonar, see animation.

Previously, a Danish diving company claimed to have identified a wreck originally found in 2005 as the UC-30. The company intended to dive on the location in the summer of 2011.

Summary of raiding history

References

Notes

Citations

Bibliography

 
 

Ships built in Hamburg
German Type UC II submarines
Maritime incidents in 1917
U-boats sunk in 1917
U-boats sunk by mines
U-boats commissioned in 1916
World War I minelayers of Germany
World War I submarines of Germany
1916 ships
World War I shipwrecks in the North Sea
Ships lost with all hands